Sidewalk Exec... is the debut studio album by American rapper Bodega Bamz. It was released on April 14, 2015, through 100 Keep It/Duck Down Music. Production was handled entirely by Tivon "V Don" Key, with Ohla and Bodega Bamz serving as executive producers. It features guest appearances from A$ton Matthews, Flatbush Zombies, Joell Ortiz, Lil' Eto and Youth Is Dead. The album appeared on several Billboard charts, peaking at No. 3 on the Top Heatseekers, No. 26 on the Independent Albums, No. 25 on the Top R&B/Hip-Hop Albums and No. 20 on the Top Rap Albums.

Track listing

Charts

References

2015 debut albums
Hip hop albums by American artists